Maxwell Finland (March 15, 1902 — October 25, 1987) was an American scientist, medical researcher, an expert on infectious diseases. Finland led seminal research of antibiotic treatment of pneumonia.

Early life and education 
Finland was born on March 15, 1902, in Zhashkiv near Kiev, Ukraine. He immigrated as a child to the United States at the age of 4. Finland graduated from the Boston English High School and cum laude from Harvard College in 1922. He then graduated from Harvard Medical School in 1926.

Antibiotic research
In 1944, he worked with Chester Keefer at the Boston Medical Center on the first studies using penicillin to treat infectious diseases.

He was noted for his strong criticism of pharmaceutical  companies for their marketing of fixed-dose antibiotics.

His outspoken criticism helped in withdrawal of those drugs from the market.
He also made significant contributions to early identifications of new infectious issues, such as resistances of bacteria to antibiotics.

Legacy
Finland was a member of the National Academies of Sciences.
His name appeared on about 800 scientific papers.
Finland turned over the money he received for numerous awards to Harvard endowment. It is estimated that between his money and the money he influenced companies to give to the school, the total contribution was around 6 million dollars.
An annual Maxwell Finland Award was established in 1988 by the National Foundation for Infectious Diseases.
The National Academies Press called Finland "a giant in the field of infectious diseases".
National Foundation for Infectious Diseases called Finland "a distinguished scholar and scientist who pioneered work in epidemiology and antimicrobial resistance, and helped define the discipline of infectious diseases as we know it today"."Maxwell Finland Award for Scientific Achievement", The National Foundation for Infectious Diseases. Accessed May 2, 2020

A building on the Boston University School of Medicine campus on Albany Street is named The Maxwell Finland Building and has housed The Maxwell Finland Laboratory for Infectious Diseases."Boston Combined Residency Program: The Maxwell Finland Laboratory for Infectious Diseases". Boston Children's Hospital/Boston Medical Center. Accessed May 2, 2020.

Awards and distinctions 
 inaugural president of the Infectious Diseases Society of America
 a member of the National Academy of Sciences
 the Kober Medal of the Association of American Physicians
 the Bristol Award of the Infectious Diseases Society of America
 the Chapin Award of the City of Providence
 the Philips Award of the American College of Physicians
 the Oscar B. Hunter Award of the American Society of Clinical Pharmacology and Therapeutics
 the Sheen Award of the American Medical Association
 honorary degrees from Western Reserve and Thomas Jefferson Universities
 honorary doctor of science (honoris causa) degree from Harvard University (1982)
 Minot Chair at Harvard

References

External links 

 Maxwell Finland papers, 1916-2003. H MS c153. Harvard Medical Library, Francis A. Countway Library of Medicine, Boston, Mass.

1902 births
1987 deaths
Members of the United States National Academy of Sciences
American medical researchers
American people of Ukrainian descent
Harvard Medical School alumni